The Église Saint-Joseph is a Roman Catholic church in Marseille.

Location
It is located in the 6th arrondissement of Marseille. The exact address is at 124-126 rue Paradis.

History
The church, alongside Église Saint-Charles in the 1st arrondissement of Marseille, was constructed as a result of the rapid expansion of Marseille and the creation of new neighbourhoods in the nineteenth century. On August 14, 1831, it was authorized by Fortuné de Mazenod (1749-1840), who served as the Bishop of Marseille from 1823 to 1837. During the construction, church-goers worshipped in the nearby Église Saint-Nicolas-de-Myre. Land was purchased from landowner Maxime Martin to build this new church.

The church building was designed by architect Pascal Coste (1787-1879) in 1833, in a similar manner as the nearby Église Saint-Lazare, also designed by Coste. Drawing upon his designs, architect Joseph Ferrié oversaw the construction of the facade. In 1868, Henri-Jacques Espérandieu (1829-1874) designed the casing of the pipe organ and the ceiling of the nave. The high altar and the baldachin were designed by Louis Sainte-Marie-Perrin (1835-1917). The pipe organ was made by Aristide Cavaillé-Coll (1811-1899). The entire church was only finalized as late as 1925. However, it was dedicated on April 25, 1855.

It has been listed as a Monument historique since February 9, 1999.

At present
It is open every day except Sunday, from Monday to Saturday from 10AM to 12PM, and from 4PM to 6PM. The current vicar is Fr Michel Roux.

Gallery

Secondary source
T. Brieugne, Monographie de la Paroisse Saint Joseph de Marseille (Imprimerie Marseillaise, 1933).

References

19th-century Roman Catholic church buildings in France
6th arrondissement of Marseille
Roman Catholic churches in Marseille
Monuments historiques of Marseille